Bust of Christopher Columbus may refer to:

Bust of Christopher Columbus (Detroit), Michigan, U.S. 
Bust of Christopher Columbus (Lancaster, Pennsylvania), U.S.

See also
 Statue of Christopher Columbus (disambiguation)
 Columbus Fountain
 Columbus Monument (disambiguation)
 List of monuments and memorials to Christopher Columbus
 Monument to Christopher Columbus (disambiguation)